Pleshkovo is a rural locality (a selo) and the administrative center of Pleshkovsky Selsoviet, Zonalny District, Altai Krai, Russia. The population was 1,280 as of 2013. There are 14 streets.

Geography 
Pleshkovo is located 23 km northwest of Zonalnoye (the district's administrative centre) by road. Bulanikha is the nearest rural locality.

References 

Rural localities in Zonalny District